Sporobacterium is a Gram-positive, strictly anaerobic and chemoorganotrophic bacterial genus from the family of Lachnospiraceae with one known species (Sporobacterium olearium). Sporobacterium olearium produces methanethiol.

References

Lachnospiraceae
Monotypic bacteria genera
Bacteria genera